Sanford School is a private school for co-ed students in PreK through high school, located in Hockessin, Delaware. Originally known as "Sunny Hills School", it was founded on September 23, 1930, by Sanford and Ellen Sawin, in memory of their eldest son Sanford Sawin Jr. The school's name was changed to Sanford in 1966, 50 years after his death.

Sanford competes in interscholastic sports as a member of the Delaware Independent School Conference. They have made history by winning both girls and boys basketball State Championships in 2010 and 2011, the first school to have done so in the history of Delaware.

Notable alumni

Trevor Cooney, Syracuse basketball player
Walter Davis, NBA star
Luis Estevez, Cuban-born American fashion designer and costume designer
 Richard Hell, punk musician, member of Television, Richard Hell and the Voidoids, The Heartbreakers, and Neon Boys
Tom Verlaine, punk musician, member of Television and Neon Boys

References

External links
 

Educational institutions established in 1930
High schools in New Castle County, Delaware
Schools in New Castle County, Delaware
Private elementary schools in Delaware
Private middle schools in Delaware
Private high schools in Delaware
Preparatory schools in Delaware
1930 establishments in Delaware